Marcin Kozubek (born 21 June 1978) is a Polish former competitive ice dancer. With Agata Błażowska, he is the 1997 World Junior bronze medalist, a two-time Ondrej Nepela Memorial champion, the 1999 Winter Universiade bronze medalist, and the 1999 Polish national champion.

Career 
Kozubek started skating at the age of 8.

He began competing with Agata Błażowska in the 1993–94 season. The two placed 18th at the 1994 World Junior Championships in Colorado Springs, Colorado and 15th at the 1996 World Junior Championships in Brisbane, Australia. Ranked third in all segments, they were awarded the bronze medal behind two Russian teams – Nina Ulanova / Michail Stifunin (gold) and Oksana Potdykova / Denis Petukhov (silver) – at the 1997 World Junior Championships in Seoul, South Korea.

Błażowska/Kozubek moved up to the senior level in the 1997–98 season. After winning gold at the 1997 Ondrej Nepela Memorial, they debuted on the Champions Series (Grand Prix), placing seventh at the 1997 Cup of Russia. The following season they took gold at the 1999 Polish Championships and bronze at the 1999 Winter Universiade.

In the 1999–2000 season, Błażowska/Kozubek were awarded gold at the 1999 Ondrej Nepela Memorial and silver at the 1999 Skate Israel. They placed 14th at the 2000 European Championships in Vienna, Austria, and 20th at the 2001 World Championships in Vancouver, British Columbia, Canada.

In October 2001, Błażowska sustained a gluteal muscle injury while warming up before the free dance at the Karl Schäfer Memorial. The duo withdrew from the event but returned to competition the following month, placing sixth at the 2001 Sparkassen Cup on Ice and seventh at the 2001 Cup of Russia. They were coached by Mirosław Plutowski in Gdańsk.

Kozubek is an ISU ice dancing judge for Poland.

Programs 
(with Błażowska)

Competitive highlights
GP: Champions Series / Grand Prix

References

External links
 

1978 births
Polish male ice dancers
Living people
Sportspeople from Gdańsk
World Junior Figure Skating Championships medalists
Universiade medalists in figure skating
Universiade bronze medalists for Poland
Competitors at the 1999 Winter Universiade
Competitors at the 2001 Winter Universiade